U.S. Highway 16 (US 16) is a  east–west U.S. Highway in the western part of the U.S. state of South Dakota. It travels between Yellowstone National Park in Wyoming and Rapid City. In South Dakota, the highway extends from the Wyoming state line near Newcastle, Wyoming to Interstate 90 (I-90) in Rapid City.

Route description

US 16 is also known as Mount Rushmore Road in western South Dakota. The highway enters South Dakota east of Newcastle, Wyoming. It travels near Jewel Cave, the third-longest cave in the world. The highway goes through the city of Custer and shares alignment with US 385. East of Hill City, US 16 splits off US 385. In Rapid City, US 16 follows Mount Rushmore Road to a concurrency with SD 44 (Omaha Street) to the southern terminus of I-190. US 16 stays concurrent with I-190 until both highways end at I-90.

This section of US 16 is defined at South Dakota Codified Laws § 31-4-138.

History
US 16 formerly ran all the way across the state, to the Minnesota state line east of Sioux Falls. It entered the state on the current routing of US 14/I-90 (the current routing is former US 216), and followed the US 14 routing to Rapid City. It joined U.S. Route 216 in Rapid City, and continued east into Box Elder. "Highway 14-16," as it was known, was a divided highway through most of Box Elder before returning to a two-lane road. (This road is still in use today, and still referred to as "14-16.") US 16 traveled east to New Underwood, then continued through the foothills to Wasta. The highway ran north of Wasta, across the Cheyenne River, then ran southeast to Wall. In Wall, an alternate route of US 16 (present day SD 240) split from the highway and headed south, through the Badlands National Monument (now Badlands National Park). US 14 and US 16 split south of Philip, with US 14 travelling due east and US 16 continuing south (following present-day SD 73 to its intersection with the eastern end of US 16 Alternate. From there, US 16 traveled due east, on the present-day routing of South Dakota Highway 248. The highway followed this routing through Kadoka, Murdo, and Vivian, where it intersected U.S. Route 83. The highway continued east to Reliance, where present-day SD 248 ends. US 16 then returned to the current routing of I-90, and followed this routing to Oacoma, where it followed the current I-90 Business Loop to a bridge over the Missouri River into Chamberlain. East of Chamberlain, US 16 followed present day Old Airport Road to East King Street, then turned onto 249th Street just north of where I-90 now lies. It followed 249th Street to Pukwana, present-day 350th Avenue to an intersection with SD 47 (now SD 50), 251st Street to Kimball, and 252nd Street to White Lake. US 16 then followed present-day County Road 34 (also named Old Highway 16) to Mount Vernon and present-day 254th Street to Mitchell. It then followed what is now SD 38 east to 421st Avenue, 421st Avenue to Alexandria, SD 262 to Bridgewater, and SD 42 to Sioux Falls. The highway followed Minnesota Avenue (SD 115), 6th Street, Sycamore Avenue, Madison Street, and Splitrock Boulevard (SD 11) to Brandon. It then followed present-day Aspen Boulevard (formerly South Dakota Highway 264) from Brandon east to the Minnesota state line north of Valley Springs.

Major intersections

Related routes

Special routes of US 16 in South Dakota consist of an alternate route that runs from Custer to near Keystone as well as truck routes in Hill City and Rapid City, and formerly included a business route in Rapid City and an alternate route between Wall and Kadoka.

South Dakota Highway 248

South Dakota Highway 248 (SD 248) is a state highway in the U.S. state of South Dakota. It travels through Lyman, Jones, and Jackson counties starting near the entrance to Badlands National Park at an intersection with SD 240 (just south of exit 131 on I-90) and terminating at exit 248 of I-90 east of Reliance. SD 248 is a former routing of US 16.

South Dakota Highway 264

South Dakota Highway 264 (SD 264) was a state highway located on a former alignment of US 16 in eastern Minnehaha County. It was created circa 1976, when the South Dakota Department of Transportation and the Minnesota Department of Transportation moved US 16 from surface streets to I-90 in the area. The route was decommissioned in 1999.

References

External links

1949 South Dakota Transportation Map

16
 South Dakota
Transportation in Custer County, South Dakota
Transportation in Pennington County, South Dakota
Transportation in Rapid City, South Dakota